This is a list of master's degrees; many are offered as "tagged degrees"
 Master of Accountancy
 Master of Advanced Study
 Masters of Agricultural Economics
 Master of Applied Finance
 Master of Applied Science
 Master of Architecture
 Master of Arts
 Master of Arts in Liberal Studies
 Master of Arts in Special Education
 Master of Arts in Teaching
Master of Bioethics
 Master of Business Administration
 Master of Business, Entrepreneurship and Technology
 Master of Business
 Master of Business Engineering
 Master of Business Informatics
 Master of Chemistry
 Master of Christian Education
 Master of City Planning
 Master of Commerce
 Master of Computational Finance
 Master of Computer Applications
 Master of Counselling
 Master of Criminal Justice
 Master of Creative Technologies
 Master of Data Science
 Master of Defence Studies
 Master of Design
 Masters of Development Economics
 Master of Divinity
 Master of Economics
 Master of Education
 Master of Engineering
 Master of Engineering Management
 Master of Applied Science
 Master of Enterprise
 Master of European Law
 Master of Finance
 Master of Financial Economics
 Master of Financial Engineering
 Master of Financial Mathematics
 Master of Fine Arts
 Master of Health Administration
 Master of Health Economics
 Master of Health Science
 Master of Humanities
 Master of Industrial and Labor Relations
 Master of International Affairs
 Master of International Business
 Masters of International Economics
 Master of International Studies
Master of Information and Cybersecurity
Master of Information and Data Science
 Master of Information Management
 Master of Information System Management
 Master of Journalism
 Master of Jurisprudence
 Master of Laws
 Master of Mass Communication
 Master of Studies in Law
 Master of Landscape Architecture
 Master of Letters
 Master of Liberal Arts
 Master of Library and Information Science
 Master of Management
 Master of Management of Innovation
 Master of Marketing
 Master of Mathematical Finance
 Master of Mathematics
 Master of Medical Science
 Master of Medicine
 Masters of Military Art and Science
 Master of Military Operational Art and Science
 Master of Ministry
 Master of Music
 Master of Music Education
 Master of Occupational Behaviour and Development
 Master of Occupational Therapy
 Master of Pharmacy
 Master of Philosophy
 Master of Physician Assistant Studies
 Master of Physics
 Master of Political Science
 Master of Professional Studies
 Master of Psychology
 Master of Public Administration
 Master of Public Affairs
 Master of Public Health
 Master of Public Management
 Master of Public Policy
 Master of Public Relations
 Master of Public Service
 Master of Quantitative Finance
 Master of Rabbinic Studies
 Master of Real Estate Development
 Master of Religious Education
 Master of Research
 Master of Sacred Music
 Master of Sacred Theology
 Master of Science
 Master of Science in Administration
 Master of Science in Archaeology
 Master of Science in Biblical Archaeology
 Master of Science in Bioinformatics
 Master of Science in Computer Science
 Master of Science in Counselling
 Master of Science in Cyber Security
 Master of Science in Engineering
 Master of Science in Development Administration
 Master of Science in Finance
 Master of Science in Health Informatics
 Master of Science in Human Resource Development
 Master of Science in Information Assurance
 Master of Science in Information Systems
 Master of Science in Information Technology
 Master of Science in Leadership
 Master of Science in Management
 Master of Science in Nursing
 Master of Science in Project Management
 Master of Science in Supply Chain Management
 Master of Science in Teaching
 Master of Science in Taxation
 Master of Science in Yoga Therapy
 Master of Social Science
 Master of Social Work
 Master of Strategic Studies
 Master of Studies
 Master of Surgery
 Master of Talmudic Law
 Master of Taxation
 Master of Theological Studies
 Master of Technology
 Master of Technology Management
 Master of Theology
 Master of Urban Planning
 Master of Veterinary Science

References 

 
Higher education-related lists